The Fokker F-10 was an enlarged development of the Fokker F.VII airliner, built in the late 1920s by the Fokker Aircraft Corporation of America. A trimotor, it carried 12 passengers, four more than the F.VII, and had a larger wing and more powerful engines.

Operational history
Fokker built 65 for commercial and military service. After the crash of a Transcontinental & Western Air F-10 in 1931, killing Notre Dame football coach Knute Rockne and seven others, which was caused by the deterioration of the wooden wing spar, the type was temporarily grounded, and it was required to undergo more frequent and rigorous inspection. Its public image was also greatly damaged, leading to its early retirement from U.S. airlines.

Variants

F-10
Initial production variant
F-10A
Improved and revised 14-passenger variant powered by three   Pratt & Whitney Wasp radial engines, often called the Super Trimotor.
C-5
United States Army designation for the evaluation of one re-engined F-10A powered by three Wright R-975 radials.
LB-2
Light bomber version.
RA-4
United States Navy designation for the evaluation of one F-10A.

Operators

Civil operators

 American Airways
 TWA
 Pan Am
 Universal Airlines
 Western Air Express (launch customer )
 Boston-Maine Airways

 Mexicana
 Aerovias Centrales

Military operators

 United States Army Air Corps designations C-5 and C-7A.

Accidents and incidents
 On June 10, 1929, a Pan Am F-10, registration NC9700 and named Cuba, struck telephone wires and crashed while taking off from Santiago de Cuba bound for Havana, killing two of five on board. The aircraft failed to gain altitude due to a waterlogged runway.
 On March 31, 1931, a Transcontinental & Western Air F-10 crashed near Bazaar, Kansas after a wing separated in flight, killing all eight on board, including football coach Knute Rockne.
 On March 19, 1932, an American Airways F-10A, registration NC652E, struck power lines in heavy fog and crashed into an orchard near Calimesa, California, killing all seven on board.
 On September 8, 1932, an American Airways F-10, registration NC9716, crashed into a mountain in poor weather near Salt Flat, Texas, killing three of four on board.

Specifications (F-10)

See also

References

External links

  A contemporary technical article on the Fokker F-10. (Though the article does not mention the long-winged F-10A, the table of specs at the end appear to be for this version. Specs in the rest of the article are for the original F-10.)

F 10
1920s United States airliners
Trimotors
High-wing aircraft